Lewistown is a city in and the county seat of Fergus County, Montana, United States. The population was 5,952 at the 2020 census. Lewistown is located in the geographic center of the state, southeast of Great Falls and northwest of Billings. First planned in 1882, it was the site of an 1880s gold rush, and served as an important railway destination, supplying surrounding communities with bricks via rail.

History
The area was the territory of the Blackfoot Native Americans. In 1874, Fort Lewis was established there by Company "F" of the 7th U.S. Infantry to provide military protection for people traveling on the Carroll Trail, then the shortest route between Carroll, Montana and Helena. Lewistown is named after this fort.

The first permanent settlers of Lewistown were Métis. The Metis established Lewistown in 1879. Pierre Berger is credited with being the founder of Lewistown. Berger, along with his wife Judith Wilkie Berger, son Isadore Berger, Isaie Berger, Jean Baptiste Berger and Jacques Berger, as well as several other families made the trek into the Lewistown area in 1879. Francis Janeaux came with the second group. Janeaux founded the first public school house in 1883. Lewistown became an incorporated city in 1899.

Lewistown was the site of a gold rush when gold was discovered in the nearby Judith Mountains in 1880. Before the gold rush, Maiden was the largest city in central Montana. When the gold supply ran out, many of the miners gained new employment in Lewistown and settled there permanently.

The railroad connected with the national railway network via a connection with the Northern Pacific Railway at Lombard. The Montana Railroad line was constructed between 1895 and 1903, and operated independently until 1908, when it was acquired by the Chicago, Milwaukee, St. Paul and Pacific Railroad ("the Milwaukee Road").

During World War II, in 1942 the US Army Air Corps established a Boeing B-17 Flying Fortress training base just west of Lewistown to train aircrews for missions in North Africa and Europe. The former airbase is now the Lewistown Municipal Airport, which is home to the last remaining Norden bombsight storage facility, used to keep the device safe from theft by enemy spies during World War II . The city park displays a Minuteman III ballistic missile.

Geography
U.S. Highway 87 intersects with U.S. Route 191 in town.

The city is located in the exact center of the state of Montana and is part of the Rocky Mountains.

Climate
Lewistown experiences a relatively dry humid continental climate (Köppen Dfb) with long, dry and usually cold winters and short, warm, wetter summers. Winter weather can either be severe due to the movement of cold polar air from Canada, or occasionally very mild or even warm due to gusty chinook winds. Temperatures do not consistently stay above freezing until June: the average window for freezing temperatures is from September 19 to May 23 – allowing a "growing season" of 92 days – and for subfreezing maxima from October 26 to April 2. The hottest temperature at Lewistown has been  on June 21, 1900 and July 31, 1900, and the coldest  on 28 January 1929. The hottest minimum has been  on July 17, 1925, and the coldest maximum  on January 29, 1916; the coldest month was January 1950 which averaged .

During the summer, days are very warm, but nights remain cool and rare freezes have occurred. The most snow on the ground has been  on February 1 and 2, 1978.

Demographics

2010 census
As of the census of 2010, there were 5,901 people, 2,761 households, and 1,512 families living in the city. The racial makeup of the city was 95.4% White, 0.3% African American, 1.7% Native American, 0.4% Asian, 0.3% from other races, and 2.0% from two or more races. Hispanic or Latino of any race were 2.1% of the population.

There were 2,761 households, of which 23.7% had children under the age of 18 living with them, 42.7% were married couples living together, 8.3% had a female householder with no husband present, 3.7% had a male householder with no wife present, and 45.2% were non-families. 39.8% of all households were made up of individuals, and 18.8% had someone living alone who was 65 years of age or older. The average household size was 2.07 and the average family size was 2.78.

The median age in the city was 45.4 years. 20.4% of residents were under the age of 18; 6.5% were between the ages of 18 and 24; 22.6% were from 25 to 44; 28.9% were from 45 to 64; and 21.7% were 65 years of age or older. The gender makeup of the city was 49.2% male and 50.8% female.

2000 census
As of the census of 2000, there were 5,813 people, 2,594 households, and 1,507 families living in the city. The population density was 3,055.3 people per square mile (1,181.3/km2). There were 2,868 housing units at an average density of 1,507.4 per square mile (582.8/km2).

The racial makeup of the city was 96.53% White, 0.07% African American, 1.41% Native American, 0.34% Asian, 0.14% from other races, and 1.51% from two or more races. Hispanic or Latino of any race were 0.72% of the population.

There were 2,594 households, out of which 26.1% had children under the age of 18 living with them, 46.5% were married couples living together, 8.6% had a female householder with no husband present, and 41.9% were non-families. 37.7% of all households were made up of individuals, and 18.4% had someone living alone who was 65 years of age or older. The average household size was 2.18 and the average family size was 2.88.

In the city, the population was spread out, with 23.5% under the age of 18, 6.8% from 18 to 24, 23.2% from 25 to 44, 23.6% from 45 to 64, and 22.8% who were 65 years of age or older. The median age was 43 years. For every 100 females there were 87.5 males. For every 100 females age 18 and over, there were 84.4 males.

The median income for a household in the city was $28,949, and the median income for a family was $36,888. Males had a median income of $30,231 versus $20,019 for females. The per capita income for the city was $16,817. About 9.0% of families and 13.6% of the population were below the poverty line, including 17.3% of those under age 18 and 12.0% of those age 65 or over.

Infrastructure
Lewistown Municipal Airport is two miles southwest of town.

Education
Lewistown Public Schools educates students from kindergarten through 12th grade. There are three elementary schools, a middle school, and Fergus High School. They are known as the Golden Eagles.

Lewistown has a public library, the Lewistown Public Library.

Arts and culture

Annual cultural events

The Chokecherry Festival is an annual event that includes a chokecherry culinary contest, pit spitting contest, 5k run/walk and 10k run. The event has been held for more than twenty-three years.

The Metis Celebration, held on Labor Day weekend, includes a pow wow, fiddling, jigging, and other Metis related activities. 2015 marked the 21st year for the festival.

Media
Radio
KXLO AM 1230 – 1,000 watts; country music
KQPZ FM 95.9 – 3,000 watts; classic rock. modern rock
Newspaper
Lewistown News-Argus

Notable people
 Loren Acton, astronaut and physicist
 Roy E. Ayers, governor and congressman
 Alma Smith Jacobs, first African American Montana State Librarian
 Ed McGivern, shooter, instructor, author of Fast and Fancy Revolver Shooting
 Jim Otten, MLB pitcher for the Chicago White Sox and St. Louis Cardinals
 Bobby Petrino, former head football coach of University of Louisville and former head coach with Atlanta Falcons and University of Arkansas
 Rick Rydell, radio talk show host and author
 Tom Stout, congressman
 Mike Taylor, politician and rancher
 Roger Youderian, Christian missionary

References

External links
 

 Official City of Lewistown website
 Lewistown Community Resources website
 Lewistown Chamber of Commerce website
 City-Data.com
 ePodunk: Profile for Lewistown Montana

Cities in Fergus County, Montana
County seats in Montana
Populated places established in 1882
1882 establishments in Montana Territory
Cities in Montana
World War II Heritage Cities